Ugrim is a rural locality (a khutor) in Belgorodsky District, Belgorod Oblast, Russia. The population was 48 as of 2010. There are 5 streets.

Geography 
Ugrim is located 8 km northwest of Maysky (the district's administrative centre) by road. Dolbino is the nearest rural locality.

References 

Rural localities in Belgorodsky District